Cara Black and Elena Likhovtseva were the defending champions and top seeds but withdrew before the start of the tournament.

Shinobu Asagoe and Els Callens won in the final 6–4, 6–3 against Kimberly Po-Messerli and Nathalie Tauziat.

Seeds
Champion seeds are indicated in bold text while text in italics indicates the round in which those seeds were eliminated.

  Cara Black /  Elena Likhovtseva (withdrew)
  Kimberly Po-Messerli /  Nathalie Tauziat (final)
  Nicole Arendt /  Liezel Huber (semifinals)
  Janet Lee /  Wynne Prakusya (first round)

Draw

Main draw

Qualifying draw

External links
 2002 DFS Classic draw 
 ITF tournament edition details

DFS Classic - Doubles
Doubles